The Vilquechico Formation is a Late Campanian to Late Maastrichtian geologic formation in southern Peru. Fossil ornithopod tracks have been reported from the formation. The formation overlies the Ayabacas Formation and is overlain by the Auzangate Formation.

Paleofauna 
In the formation, tracks of the following species have been found:
 Ornithomimipus jaillardi
 Hadrosaurichnus titicacaensis

See also 
 List of dinosaur-bearing rock formations
 List of stratigraphic units with ornithischian tracks
 Ornithopod tracks

References

Bibliography 
 
 
  

Geologic formations of Peru
Upper Cretaceous Series of South America
Cretaceous Peru
Campanian Stage
Maastrichtian Stage of South America
Sandstone formations
Shale formations
Ichnofossiliferous formations
Paleontology in Peru
Geography of Puno Region